Shawn or Sean Nelson may refer to:

Shawn Timothy Nelson (1959–1995), American best known for going on a tank rampage in San Diego, California
Shawn Nelson (American football) (born 1985), American football player for the New York Jets
Shawn Clement Nelson, American actor and acting coach
Shawn David Nelson, American entrepreneur
Shaun Nelson (born 1973), Australian politician
Sean Nelson (born 1973), American musician and writer
Sean Nelson (actor) (born 1980), American actor